Good Luck (French: Bonne chance!) is a 1935 French romantic comedy film directed by Sacha Guitry and Fernand Rivers and starring Guitry, Jacqueline Delubac and Pauline Carton. In it a woman becomes convinced a man she has met is a good luck charm after she wins a lottery.

It was shot at the Billancourt Studios and on location in Paris and Monaco. The film's sets were designed by the art director Robert Gys.

In 1940 it was remade as an American film Lucky Partners starring Ronald Colman and Ginger Rogers.

Cast
 Sacha Guitry as Claude  
 Jacqueline Delubac as Marie  
 Pauline Carton as La mère de Marie  
 Paul Dullac as Le maire de Marie  
 Montel  as Un vieux monsieur qui passe  
 André Numès Fils as Prosper  
 Rivers Cadet as Le greffier 
 Robert Darthez as Gastion Lepeltier  
 Andrée Guize as Henriette Lepeltier  
 Lucienne Givry as L'élégante  
 Simone Sandre as L'épicière  
 Madeleine Suffel as La gantière 
 Antoine as Antoine, le coiffeur  
 Louis Baldy as L'employé de banque  
 Renée Dennsy as Une radeuse  
 Gustave Huberdeau 
 Régine Paris 
 Robert Seller as Le maître d'hôtel  
 Louis Vonelly as Le marchand de tableaux

Critical reception
Writing for The Spectator in 1936, Graham Greene gave the film a good review, describing it as "a charming silly film in the Clair genre, a lyrical absurdity". Greene notes that it is only cinema and music that can produce such uplifting transience and joy.

References

Bibliography 
 Dayna Oscherwitz & MaryEllen Higgins. The A to Z of French Cinema. Scarecrow Press, 2009.

External links 
 

1935 romantic comedy films
French romantic comedy films
1935 films
1930s French-language films
Films directed by Sacha Guitry
Films directed by Fernand Rivers
Films shot at Billancourt Studios
French black-and-white films
1930s French films